Egeskov Castle is located near Kværndrup, in the south of the island of Funen, Denmark. The castle is Europe's best preserved Renaissance water castle.

History
Egeskov was first mentioned in 1405. The castle structure was erected by Frands Brockenhuus in 1554.

Due to the troubles caused by the civil war known as the Count's Feud (Danish: Grevens fejde), general civil unrest, and a civil war introducing the Protestant Reformation, most Danish noblemen built their homes as fortifications. Originally, the only access was by means of a drawbridge. According to legend, it took an entire forest of oak trees to build the foundation, hence the name Egeskov (oak forest).

The estate has belonged to the Bille-Brahe family since 1784, when they acquired it from descendants of the Brockenhuus family. In 1882 it was inherited by the counts Ahlefeldt-Laurvig-Bille, who still own it.

Castle architecture
Outside, the castle is a Late Gothic building. Inside the original elements already show Renaissance design.

The castle consists of two long buildings connected by a thick double wall, allowing defenders to abandon one house and continue fighting from the other. The double wall is over one meter thick and contains secret staircases and a well. Defenders were able to attack an enemy's flanks from the two round corner towers. Other medieval defences include artillery ports, scalding holes and arrow slits. The bricks composing the castle are of an oversized medieval type sometimes called "monks bricks". The conical towers are constructed in a series of separate panels.

The architecture includes depressed and round-arched windows, round-arched blank arcading within the gables, and a double string course between the high cellar and the ground floor. The structure contains some of the early indoor plumbing design first used in Europe with vertical shafts for waste. The thick double wall also contains a water well which is accessed from the servants kitchen in the east house.  Several of the large rooms have massive parallel exposed beams with some end carving.

Castle contents
Contents of the castle include a massive iron chest from at least as early as the 16th century, which derived from Hvedholm Castle, a property earlier owned by the Egeskov estate about twenty kilometers to the west.

Numerous oil paintings are found within the castle including a large painting in the great hall on the first floor of Niels Juel, who defeated the Swedish force in the Battle of Køge Bay in the year 1677.

Gardens and lands
Other buildings belonging to Egeskov include Ladegården, a thatched half-timbered building which is now part of the museum. Other buildings are used by the museum and for farming. Surrounding the castle is an old park, covering 20 hectares (49 acres) of land. The park is divided into a number of gardens. The renaissance garden features fountains, a gravel path and topiary figures. The fuchsia garden, one of the largest in Europe, contains 104 different species. Other gardens near the castle include an English garden, a water garden, an herb garden, a vegetable garden, and a peasant's garden (bondehave). The gardens also feature four hedge mazes. The oldest is a beech maze several hundreds of years old. This garden is trimmed every year to prevent the trees from dying. The newest maze is the world's largest bamboo maze. It features a Chinese tower in the centre, and a bridge from the tower provides the exit from the maze. The parks feature a three-meter-tall sundial designed by Danish poet and mathematician, Piet Hein.

The estate includes an additional eight square kilometres;  is forest, with the rest being farmland. In 1986, a full-sized replica of the castle was built in Hokkaidō, Japan, to hold an aquarium. This was constructed with the permission of the Egeskov's owners at the time, Count Claus and Countess Louisa Ahlefeldt-Laurvig-Bille.

Museums
Egeskov is home to the following museums.
 A vintage automobile collection
 A vintage motorcycle collection
 A collection describing the history of agriculture
 A collection of flying vehicles
 A collection of Falck and other emergency vehicles

Most of the castle is open to the public, except for the areas used by Count Michael Ahlefeldt-Laurvig-Bille. The museum of agriculture and the horse wagon collection is located in the building Ladegård mentioned previously.

Three large modern buildings are occupied by the vintage automobile collection, the vintage motorcycle collection, the Falck collection, and by a collection of airplanes and helicopters. The Falck collection is a collection of vehicles from the Danish rescue company, Falck, emergency vehicles such as fire trucks, ambulances, rescue boats, and other assorted emergency vehicles.

List of owners

Gallery

See also
Horne Church
List of castles and palaces in Denmark
Medieval warfare
Siegecraft

References

Literature

External links

Official homepage of Egeskov Castle

Houses completed in 1554
Castles in Denmark
Listed buildings and structures in Faaborg-Midtfyn Municipality
Listed castles and manor houses in Denmark
Castles and manor houses on Funen
Water castles
Museums in the Region of Southern Denmark
Historic house museums in Denmark
Renaissance architecture in Denmark
Tourist attractions in the Region of Southern Denmark
1554 establishments in Denmark
Buildings and structures associated with the Brockenhuus family
Buildings and structures in Denmark associated with the Brahe family
Buildings and structures associated with the Ahlefeldt family
Buildings and structures associated with the Bille family
Buildings and structures associated with the Ulfeldt family